.ao is the Internet country code top-level domain (ccTLD) for Angola. It was originally administered by the college of engineering of the University of Agostinho Neto before being redelegated to the Ministry of Telecommunications and Information Technologies.

History

New Registry (DNS.AO)

On 17 June 2019, commercial registration of domains was relaunched, with a single registrar approved for issuance, the government-run Serviços Públicos Electrónicos do Governo de Angola. Registration cost was reduced to 8000 Kwanzas per year. By January 2020, 2500 new registrations were received, six times more than in the previous five years. Registrations from outside Angola are not yet permitted.

Original Registry (Reg.AO)

In January 2019, the old registry's website has not been modified since December 2001, and consisted of a single page in Portuguese. One of the few links on the page was to a document in Microsoft Word format, in English, which gave registration rules for the domain; they stated that registration by entities outside Angola was to be done only in the .it.ao subdomain. The search engine Google seems to be the first .it.ao entity using the subdomain ".it.ao". It also said that registrations were only taken at the third level. Registration cost was US$300.

References

External links
 IANA .ao whois information
 Registrar
 Information about African domain names

Communications in Angola
Country code top-level domains

sv:Toppdomän#A